Sueña conmigo (in English Dream about Me) is an original telenovela produced by Nickelodeon Latin America, Illusion Studios and Televisa. This is the 5th Latin American production for Nickelodeon. The first announcement was after the last episode of the telenovela of the same channel Isa TK+. In Hispanic America, the sneak preview was on July 20, 2010, the official release was on August 23, 2010.

Production
Executive Producers are Sofia Ioannou, CEO of MTV Networks Latin America and Tatiana Rodriguez, Senior Vice President of Programming and Creative Strategy, Nickelodeon Latin America. The Televisa production area with Roberto Gómez Fernández in the lead, will actively participate in the creative process, to provide expertise on gender children and adolescents.

Synopsis
The story recounts the love between Clara Molina and Luca Rassi; they are two teenagers who are willing to do anything to fulfill their dreams. Clara loves to sing, so she decides to join  Soy Tu Super Star, a reality show where the winner will become famous. But Clara's father won't let her join the show, so Clara created Roxy Pop. Luca's passion is music, so along with his friends Chediak, Enzo Di Carlo, Slashrr and João Donoso they start a band called Lost Boys. Luca Rassi's girlfriend, Marcia Lima was the lead singer, but she also wanted to participate in the reality show, so she left the band. Titan is a guy who is in love with Clara, but she doesn't like him. He's always trying to do the impossible (and mostly for Luca) and get her to be his girlfriend. Later, Clara learns that her father is dating a woman who has a daughter called Nuria Gomez; she too has fallen for Luca and is willing to do whatever it takes to get him. Will Clara and Luca succeed in their dreams and realize their love for each other? Will Clara reveal Roxy's identity?

Cast
Eiza González as Clara Molina / Roxy Pop
Santiago Ramundo as Luca Grossi
Vanesa Leiro as Marcia Lima
Valentín Villafañe as Titán
Brenda Asnicar as Nuria Gomez 
Gabriel Ramos as  Gabo 
Micaela Castellotti as Herself 
Gastón Soffritti as  Iván Quintero
Agustina Quinci as  Violeta / Mimi
Brian Vainberg as  Mauro
Federico Baron as  Rafael Molina 
Delfina Peña as Samanta

Music
The soundtrack of the series was released in Latin America as of November 29, 2010. The album includes 12 songs, based on the number of television.

 1."Sueña conmigo" - Elenco de Sueña Conmigo
 2."Soy tu super star" - Eiza González
 3."Cuando yo te vi" - Eiza González and Santiago Ramundo
 4."Hablan de mí" - Brenda Asnicar
 5."El circo de la vida" - Santiago Ramundo
 6."Dime que sí, dime que no" - Eiza González
 7."Como perro y gato" - Eiza González
 8."Siempre te esperaré" - Brenda Asnicar
 9."El tren" - Santiago Ramundo
 10."Contigo todo" - Eiza González and Santiago Ramundo
 11."Igual que yo" - Vanesa Gabriela Leiro
 12."El ritmo de mi gente" - Eiza González and Santiago Ramundo

Awards

See also 
Nickelodeon Latin America
Isa TKM
Isa TK+
Skimo
Kally's MashUp

References

2010s Argentine television series
2010 telenovelas
2010 Argentine television series debuts
2011 Argentine television series endings
Argentine telenovelas
Spanish-language telenovelas
Televisa telenovelas
Teen telenovelas
Nickelodeon telenovelas
Television series about teenagers
Spanish-language Nickelodeon original programming